The Battle of Soissons of 718 CE was the last of the great pitched battles of the civil war between the heirs of Pepin of Heristal. Since Pepin's death in December 714, his grandson and heir Theudoald, his widow Plectrude, his bastard son Charles Martel, his successor as mayor of the palace in Neustria Ragenfrid, and the new king Chilperic II had been waging a war for ascendancy. Though Ragenfrid and Chilperic had begun with successes and Plectrude and Theudoald were removed early, Martel turned the tide of war and eventually forced the surrender of all his opponents.

After their defeat at the Battle of Vincy, Chilperic and Ragenfrid allied with Odo the Great, the independent duke of Aquitaine, and marched on Soissons. Unfortunately, Charles had anticipated this, and was awaiting them, with an ever better trained core of veterans, many of whom would serve him all their adult lives. That army easily defeated the allied forces of Odo, Chilperic, and Ragenfrid near Soissons. The king fled with his ducal ally to the land south of the Loire and Ragenfrid fled to Angers. Soon Odo made peace and surrendered Chilperic to Charles and Ragenfrid made peace too. The war was over and Charles was undisputed dux Francorum.

Charles chose not to execute any of his enemies, indeed, his nephew would serve in his army, and was treated kindly. Nor was his grandmother Plectrude treated with anything but kindness. Finally, Charles allowed both the deposed king, Chilperic and his mayor, Ragenfrid to live. Norwich has commented that "either Charles Martel possessed a degree of decency and kindness to defeated foes unknown in that age, or his belief in himself was so great that he felt he could afford kindness as the ultimate show of strength in allowing them to live after their various plots and machinations against him."

Further reading

Oman, Charles. The Dark Ages 476-918. Rivingtons: London, 1914.

Soissons
Soissons
Soissons
718
8th century in Francia